Ricky 1 is a 1988 American comedy film that parodies the Rocky film series. It was written, edited, produced, and directed by William T. Naud (credited as Bill Naud). Many gags parody events in Rocky but also make reference to other films, such as The Godfather.

Plot
A down on his luck male stripper and gigolo, Ricky Wanero, trains to become a boxing champion and take on the Silver Shadow.

Cast
Michael Michaud as Ricky, a parody of Rocky Balboa
Maggie Hughes as Angela, a parody of Adrianna Pennino-Balboa
Hawthorne James (Credited as "James Herbert") as The Champ/Silver Shadow, a parody of Apollo Creed
Lane Montano as Vinnie, a parody of Mickey Goldmill
Peter Zellers as Leon / Patton
Jimmy Williams (Credited as "Jon Chaney") as Cutman / The Hitman / Arnie / Manny the Fighter
Brent Beckett as Brutal Bruce 
Lloyd Haslip as Bruce's Manager

Production
According to TV Guide, the film was shot in 1983 but shelved until 1988.

Reception
The film remained almost entirely obscure until internet personality and filmmaker James Rolfe (best known for the Angry Video Game Nerd webseries) reviewed it as part of his mock feud with Doug Walker (Nostalgia Critic) in 2008. He panned the film for its mostly subpar attempts at clever humor, poor plot, and nonsensical references that had nothing to do with the Rocky films.

References

External links
 Ricky 1 at the Internet Movie Database
 Ricky 1 at Rotten Tomatoes

American parody films
American sports comedy films
American boxing films
Films scored by Joel Goldsmith
1988 films
1980s sports comedy films
1980s parody films
1988 comedy films
1980s English-language films
1980s American films